Johana Beatriz Fuenmayor Choles is a Venezuelan épée fencer.

Career 
She qualified to the women's foil event of the 2012 Summer Olympics through the zone tournament for the Americas. She defeated 15–9 Egypt's Eman El Gammal in the first round, but lost 4–15 in the next round to eventual silver medallist Arianna Errigo.

Personal life 
She is a member of the Church of Jesus Christ of Latter-day Saints.

References

Venezuelan female épée fencers
Living people
Olympic fencers of Venezuela
Fencers at the 2012 Summer Olympics
Venezuelan Latter Day Saints
1979 births
Sportspeople from Maracaibo
Pan American Games medalists in fencing
Pan American Games bronze medalists for Venezuela
South American Games gold medalists for Venezuela
South American Games medalists in fencing
Fencers at the 2011 Pan American Games
Competitors at the 2010 South American Games
Medalists at the 2011 Pan American Games
21st-century Venezuelan women